Mexico is a novel by James A. Michener published in 1992.

Plot

The main action of Mexico takes place in Mexico over a three-day period in the fictional city of Toledo in 1961. The occasion is the annual bullfighting festival, at which two matadors — one an acclaimed hero of the sport, the other a scrapping contender — are prepared to fight to the death for fame and glory.

Through the memories of the book's narrator, Norman Clay, an American journalist of Spanish and Indian descent, Michener provides plenty of historical background, including a depiction of the fictitious Indian civilization that once flourished on the city's periphery. The story focuses on bullfighting, but also provides insight into Mexican culture. The reader follows the bulls from their breeding to their "sorting" to the pageantry and spectacle of the bullring, where picadors and banderilleros prepare the bull for the entrance of the matador with his red cape.

References 

1992 American novels
Novels by James A. Michener
Random House books
Novels set in Mexico
Fiction set in 1961
Novels set in the 1960s
Novels about journalists